Sascha Görres (born 27 February 1980) is a German former professional footballer who played as a defender.

Career

Early career in Germany
Born in Flensburg, Görres grew up playing in the youth system of German Verbandsliga Schleswig-Holstein-Nord-West (sixth tier) team ETSV Weiche, eventually graduating to play for the senior side in 1999 at the age of 19. He transferred to TSB Flensburg in 2002, and played 32 games for the team in the fifth-tier Schleswig-Holstein-Liga in 2002–03, while simultaneously studying at the University of Flensburg.

College
Görres transferred from the University of Flensburg to the University of North Carolina at Pembroke in the United States in 2003 to study applied sciences and play on the college soccer team. He garnered PBC All-Conference, All-Region and All-State honors in his freshman season at Pembroke, and in his second year was an All-Conference, All-Tournament and first team All-American (NCAA Division II) pick, and was named to the NSCAA All-Southeast Region squad and the NSCAA/Adidas Scholar All-American squad.

Professional
Görres turned professional when he was drafted by the Richmond Kickers of the USL Second Division in the 2005 USL First Division College Draft. He has been ever-present for the Kickers since then; he was a USL2 All-League First Team selection in 2006, earned USL-2 All-League First Team honors and was a USL-2 Defender of the Year Finalist in 2008, and helped the Kickers to two USL Second Division championships in 2006 and 2009.

Coaching career
Görres received his US Soccer A-Youth License in 2017.  He served as Assistant Coach of the Richmond Kickers Pro Team from 2014 to 2018. In the past, Görres coached several Richmond Kickers youth teams as well as ETSV Weiche C-Youth to the Flensburg city championship during the 2002–2003 season. He is Academy Director for the Richmond United Boys DA program.

Honors
Richmond Kickers
 USL Second Division: 2006, 2009

References

External links
Richmond Kickers bio 
USL Profile 

1980 births
Living people
People from Flensburg
German footballers
Footballers from Schleswig-Holstein
Association football defenders
SC Weiche Flensburg 08 players
Richmond Kickers players
University of North Carolina at Pembroke alumni
USL First Division players
USL Second Division players
USL Championship players
German expatriate footballers
German expatriate sportspeople in the United States
Expatriate soccer players in the United States